The Common Catechism: A Book of Christian Faith is an ecumenical Christian catechism that is the result of Roman Catholic-Protestant dialogue and work. It was first published in 1973 and is the first joint catechism published by theologians of the Roman Catholic Church, and the Lutheran Church and the Reformed Church, among other Protestant traditions, since the Reformation:

The Christian theologians writing the text "trust that their common witness will arouse each individual Christian to a joint testimony of faith in the Christian life". The Common Catechism is interdenominational in that it presents "a joint account of the Christian faith" and is regarded as a major fruit of ecumenical commitment.

See also

Concelebration
Open communion
Catechism of the Catholic Church
Luther's Catechism (disambiguation)
Westminster Catechism

References

External links 
First Common Catechism for Catholics and Protestants to be Published Easter 1975 (Episcopal News Service)
The Common Catechism by  Raoul Dederen (Ministry Magazine)

Catholic–Protestant ecumenism
Catechisms
Catechisms of the Catholic Church